Inventing the AIDS Virus is a 1996 book by molecular biologist Peter Duesberg, in which the author argues that HIV does not cause AIDS. Duesberg contends that HIV is a harmless passenger virus and that AIDS is caused by unrelated factors such as drug abuse, antiretroviral medication, chronic malnutrition, poor sanitation, and hemophilia. The unambiguous scientific consensus is that HIV causes AIDS and that Duesberg's claims are incorrect. Duesberg received a negative response from the scientific community for supporting AIDS denialism, misrepresenting and ignoring the scientific evidence that HIV causes AIDS, and for relying upon poor logic and manipulation. The book was also the subject of an authorship dispute with one of his graduate students.

Summary

Duesberg maintains that AIDS is not an infectious disease. He argues that the accepted theory that HIV causes AIDS fails Koch's postulates, that HIV is a passenger virus unrelated to AIDS, and that drugs such as AZT, ddI, and ddC induce AIDS-like symptoms. In his view, AIDS in developed countries is primarily caused by heavy recreational drug use, particularly among the primary risk-group of young male homosexuals, in combination with repeated bacterial, viral, and parasitic infections, whereas AIDS in developing countries is a manifestation of the long-established diseases of malnutrition and unsanitary living conditions. He criticizes the Centers for Disease Control, National Institutes of Health and the National Science Foundation, charging them with stifling creativity and concealing the true causes of AIDS. He describes them as being captured by "virus hunters" after the Cutter Incident of 1955, contending that the war on cancer has been from the start primarily a search for cancer viruses, and that funding for such searches had long since overtaken the development of chemotherapy for specific treatments of cancer and the study of chemicals as environmental causes of cancer, and that such misapplied efforts are the primary reasons for the failure of that war to produce economically effective results. He argues that later medical and scientific leaders succumbed to political pressure to quickly find a cure for AIDS, and that the profit potential from the marketing of the HIV test and antiretroviral drugs also played its part. He also criticizes the gay press of the 1980s and 1990s for legitimizing AZT and related drugs in advertisements paid for by their manufacturers.

Publication history
Inventing the AIDS Virus was first published in 1996 by Regnery Publishing. The book was initially co-written with Bryan Ellison, one of Duesberg's graduate students at the University of California, Berkeley. However, following a 1994 dispute over manuscript changes, Ellison published the manuscript himself, under the title Why We Will Never Win the War on AIDS, listing himself as the lead author. A dispute between Duesberg and Ellison resulted, with Ellison charging that Duesberg was "doing favors on behalf of several people in the government" who wished to suppress the book.

Ellison also charged Duesberg with "cooperat[ing] with some of the very hostile factors to have me thrown out of school right before I could submit my thesis and get my Ph.D." Duesberg stated that "...since [Ellison] didn't talk to me anymore and didn't show up at the lab, I couldn't pay him anymore." Duesberg and Regnery Publishing sued Ellison for breach of contract and copyright violations, winning a "six-figure verdict" and an injunction against Ellison's manuscript. In a publisher's preface to Inventing the AIDS Virus, Regnery described the dispute in terms of Ellison becoming "disenchanted with Duesberg's and his publisher's insistence on careful documentation."

Reception

Media commentary
Inventing the AIDS Virus received a positive review from David Crowe in Natural Life, mixed reviews from Tina Neville in Library Journal and Richard Horton in The New York Review of Books, and negative reviews from the sociologist Steven Epstein in The Washington Post, the physician June E. Osborn in The New York Times Book Review, and Phyllida Brown in New Scientist. The book was also reviewed by Ray Olson in Booklist. 

Crowe acknowledged that the book was controversial, but credited Duesberg with showing that "medical science has often before looked for an infectious cause to diseases that were actually caused by dietary deficiencies or even induced by drugs." He wrote that the book was well researched and referenced, and "a complex, mystifying tale where pride, greed and obstinacy have allegedly derailed science." Neville wrote that the book was weakened by Duesberg's "obvious (and perhaps justified) bitterness about scientific politics" but that Duesberg raises "many thought-provoking points that deserve consideration, particularly since scientific research is dependent on the critical examination of ideas."

Horton credited Duesberg with drawing together his previous arguments about HIV into a coherent form, exposing misleading research and exaggerated predictions about the spread of AIDS, and showing how "dissidents who share his view have been snubbed by most other scientists" and how diseases have wrongly been blamed on infectious agents in the past. However, he wrote that Duesberg's arguments potentially undermined public health injunctions about the need for safe sex and calls to offer clean needles to injecting drug users, that his conclusion that only a correlation between HIV and AIDS has been established is mistaken, that his views on the role of drugs in AIDS and the AIDS epidemic in Africa were flawed, that studies on hemophiliacs conflicted with his views, and that his claim that HIV exists in a latent phase once integrated in a host cell is incorrect. He concluded that Duesberg failed to understand epidemiology, but added that, "as a retrovirologist, Duesberg deserves to be heard, and the ideological assassination that he has undergone will remain an embarrassing testament to the reactionary tendencies of modern science" and that the need for new ideas meant that Duesberg's research should be funded. In a subsequent exchange of letters with Duesberg, Horton wrote that while the central role of HIV in the development of immunodeficiency was established by epidemiological and laboratory evidence, Duesberg was correct to predict that "the virus alone is not enough to explain all aspects of the immunodeficiency process."

Epstein considered the book "readable and engaging ... though at times digressive and in need of a stronger editorial hand." He found Duesberg to be at his most appealing when criticizing the "mores and customs of the modern, commercialized world of Big Science", but wrote that Duesberg's "incautious hyperbole" detracted from the presentation. He criticized Duesberg for the way he responded to "new evidence and contrary arguments", giving as an example the way Duesberg repeated the claim that "HIV is found in far too few blood cells of AIDS patients to be a plausible destroyer of the immune system" despite more recent evidence showing "much higher blood levels of the virus". He faulted Duesberg for saying little about the fact that high percentages of HIV positive people experience a decline in T-cells and develop the opportunistic infections associated with immune dysfunction whereas HIV negative people "simply do not", and for misrepresenting the medical community as having moved toward his position on AZT. He granted that Duesberg raised "important questions about the scientific policing of deviant views", but criticized him for creating a "conspiracy theory" about virus hunters suppressing dissent.

Osborn rejected Duesberg's views. She criticized him for maintaining that "there can be no such thing as an illness induced by a virus that has its overt onset years after initial infection" and "that no virus can cause more than a single disease, or any disease that appears after a neutralizing immune response develops", writing that "decades of progress in understanding infectious diseases" showed otherwise. She wrote that he was unaware that immune suppression caused by HIV takes a distinctive form, ignored epidemiological and clinical evidence that establish the role of HIV in AIDS, made proposals that would harm public health, and had misleading views on "microbial pathogenesis in general".

Brown described the book, along with Neville Hodgkinson's AIDS: The Failure of Contemporary Science (1996), as "classic polemics by “AIDS dissidents”", writing that they repeat "now well-rehearsed arguments" that HIV is not the cause of AIDS. She concluded that while AIDS research has a "chequered history and "some of the questions raised by Duesberg and his followers were valid", Duesberg and Hodgkinson's arguments were "circular" and "ignore diverse and robust evidence linking HIV with AIDS".

Reception in the gay community
Prior to its publication, Inventing the AIDS Virus was discussed in the New York Native, which reported on the dispute between Duesberg and Ellison. After the book's publication, the New York Native presented comments about it from professors at the University of California at Berkeley, California. The biochemist J. B. Neilands supported Duesberg's views, while the epidemiologist Warren Winkelstein criticized them. Inventing the AIDS Virus was reviewed in the New York Native by Tom Steele. John Lauritsen credited Duesberg with cogently explaining the logic of Koch's first postulate and providing a clear explanation of how AZT functions as a "non-selective terminator of DNA synthesis".

Scientific response
Duesberg's central premise, that HIV is not the cause of AIDS, has been rejected by the scientific community as a form of AIDS denialism. Inventing the AIDS Virus received negative reviews from the virologist John P. Moore in Nature and Peter D. Friedmann in Perspectives in Biology and Medicine. It was also discussed by Malcolm Maclure in Epidemiology.

Moore described the book as pervaded by conspiracy theories. He rejected Duesberg's claims that "AZT causes AIDS and that HIV is a mere passenger virus" and questioned Duesberg's "understanding of modern virology", writing that Duesberg mistakenly asserted that retroviruses do not kill cells, that it is difficult to extract HIV from an "antibody-positive person", and that "HIV is dormant in vivo". Moore also argued that Duesberg was mistaken to believe that there is a "paradox in the fact that HIV can be grown in permanently infected, immortal T-cell lines in vitro, yet is supposed to cause AIDS by killing T cells in vivo." Though he accepted that Duesberg "has an outstanding knowledge of the relatively simple avian leukaemia viruses with which he made his professional reputation", he criticized Duesberg for basing his views on HIV on his early research experience, and for failing to publish "any papers based on his own work with HIV at the laboratory bench." He concluded that, "Duesberg wraps together his twisted facts and illogical lines of argument to create a tangled web to trap the unwary, desperate or gullible" and that Duesberg's arguments against the idea that HIV causes AIDS were "sad" and "ultimately pathetic."

Friedmann described the book as "tendentious" and argued that Duesberg failed to provide a balanced discussion of issues related to AIDS. He accused Duesberg of mentioning only facts that supported his views and ignoring contradictory evidence, failing to understand "even basic epidemiological concepts", and making mistaken claims about virology.

Maclure considered Duesberg's approach pseduoscientific and wrote that his "alternative hypotheses are imprecise mixtures, with flexible caveats, buttressed with supporting evidence but sheltered from conflicting evidence". He accused Duesberg of "dogmatism" and wrote that he provided an "unquantitative critique of the biases of AIDS scientists", and "704 pages of seemingly scientific evidence in support of hypotheses that are widely regarded as wrong." He noted that Duesberg is "well informed, with a broad and deep technical knowledge of viruses and microbes and a storehouse of facts about how public agencies responded to the epidemic", and cited eminent scientists who "initially found his argument and evidence intriguing or alarming". Nevertheless, he accused Duesberg of logical fallacies, and criticized him for trying to show that HIV is not the cause of AIDS by "reasoning by analogy with other retroviruses that he claimed were known to be harmless." He argued that while Duesberg put forward a "changeable" mixture of ideas that could not be falsified, he also accused Duesberg of ignoring contrary evidence and accusing others of being influenced in their views by political, psychological, and other forces but not himself.

References

Bibliography
Books

 
 

Journals

 
  
 
 
 
 
 
 
 
  
  
 
  
  
  

Online articles

External links
Preview at Google Books
Review by Phyllida Brown

1996 non-fiction books
Books by Peter Duesberg
English-language books
HIV/AIDS denialist books
HIV/AIDS in literature
Regnery Publishing books